The rivière aux Trembles (English: Aspen River) is a tributary of Pémonca River, flowing in the unorganized territory of Lac-Ashuapmushuan, in the Le Domaine-du-Roy Regional County Municipality, in the administrative region of Saguenay–Lac-Saint-Jean, in the province from Quebec, to Canada.

The Trembles river valley is mainly served by forest roads. Its course more or less marks the southern limit of the Ashuapmushuan Wildlife Reserve.

Forestry (mainly forestry) is the main economic activity in this valley; recreational tourism activities, second, main because of the Ashuapmushuan wildlife reserve.

Geography 
The Trembles river has its source at the mouth of a small lake. This source is located in a forest area in the municipality of La Doré, at:
  east of the course of the rivière du Cran;
  north of a mountain peak;
  west of downtown Saint-Félicien.

  to the east, collecting at the beginning of the segment the discharge (coming from the south) from Lac Aubord and at the end of the segment the discharge (coming from the north) from Lac Allegrin, to a river bend, corresponding to a stream (coming from the north);
  towards the north-east, forming a loop towards the south at the start of the segment, then going up towards the north-east relatively in a straight line, collecting the discharge (coming from the north) from the Lake du Héron, the outlet of Lac de la Dalle, collecting 4 streams (coming from the south), and turning east at the end of the segment, up to a bend in the river;
  towards the south-east while bending towards the east at the end of the segment, until the discharge (coming from the south) of a set of lakes including Vert, du Cordon, and stirrup;
  to the north, forming a loop to the southeast to collect the discharge (coming from the southeast) of a stream, to its mouth.

The Rivière aux Trembles pours into the bottom of a narrow bay to the south-east of Lac à la Truite, which turns out to be one of the two head lakes of the Pémonca river. This confluence is located at:

  north-west of downtown Saint-Félicien;
  south-west of the mouth of the Pémonca River.

Toponymy 
The toponym "rivière Pémonca" was formalized on December 5, 1968, at the Place Names Bank of the Commission de toponymie du Québec.

See also 

 List of rivers of Quebec

Notes and references

External links 
 Ashuapmushuan Wildlife Reserve website

Rivers of Saguenay–Lac-Saint-Jean
Le Domaine-du-Roy Regional County Municipality